Julio San Emeterio (31 March 1930 – 28 April 2010) was a Spanish professional racing cyclist. He rode in five editions of the Tour de France.

References

External links
 

1930 births
2010 deaths
Spanish male cyclists
People from Torrelavega
Cyclists from Cantabria